Darwinia polychroma, commonly known as harlequin bell, is a species of flowering plant in the myrtle family Myrtaceae and is endemic to Western Australia. It has linear leaves and drooping flowers surrounded by yellowish green, green and red bracts.

Description
Each flower has two boat-shaped to egg-shaped bracteoles at the base. Flowering mainly occurs from July to September.

Taxonomy
Darwinia polychroma was first formally described in 2009 by Gregory John Keighery in the journal Nuytsia from specimens collected near Carnamah in 1995. The specific epithet (polychroma) means "many-colours", referring to the involucral bracts.

Distribution and habitat
It is found amongst open low scrub or shrubland with Melaleuca species, Acacia ligulata, mallee (Eucalyptus species) and Exocarpos species growing in yellow loamy sand over laterite. Three populations occur on road or railway reserves with one on private property. The total populations is less than 200 plants.

Conservation status
This darwinia is listed as "endangered" under the Australian Government Environment Protection and Biodiversity Conservation Act 1999 and as "threatened" by the Western Australian Government Department of Biodiversity, Conservation and Attractions, meaning that it is in danger of extinction.

References

polychroma
Endemic flora of Western Australia
Myrtales of Australia
Rosids of Western Australia
Plants described in 2009
Taxa named by Gregory John Keighery